Griffin, also known as the Invisible Man, is a fictional character who first appeared as the protagonist of H. G. Wells' 1897 science fiction novel The Invisible Man. In the original work, Griffin is a scientist whose research in optics and experiments into changing the human body's refractive index to that of air results in him becoming invisible. After becoming invisible, he wraps his head in bandages and dons a pair of goggles or glasses in order to enable others to see him. Unable to reverse the invisibility process, he descends into insanity and becomes a criminal.

The character and variations thereof has been featured in various media, including films, television series and merchandise. The most famous non-literary incarnation of Griffin is portrayed by Claude Rains in the 1933 film The Invisible Man, distributed by Universal Pictures. The film spawned a number of sequels that feature different invisible characters. Griffin and the 1933 film have become iconic in popular culture, particularly in regards to horror fiction. A new film, loosely inspired by the original novella and the original film, again titled The Invisible Man, was released in 2020.

Overview
Griffin is a brilliant research scientist who discovers a formula for making a human being invisible. The formula entails taking opium and another drug, which makes his blood boil, then processing his body in a radiator engine. He succeeds, but he finds himself unable to reverse the process. Unlike the character in the 1933 film, the Griffin of the novel is possibly a psychopath or sociopath even before he makes himself invisible.

In the novel
Griffin is a gifted old medical student with albinism who studies optical density. He believes he is on the verge of a great scientific discovery, but feels uncomfortable working under his professor named Hobbema (whom he calls a "thief of ideas"). To ensure that he gets sole credit for the discovery, he leaves the university and moves to a dingy apartment to continue his experiments alone.

To finance his experiments, Griffin robs his own father, which drives the father to commit suicide (because the money had not even been his own). Working as a recluse in his flat, Griffin invents a formula to bend light and decrease the refractive index of physical objects, making them invisible. He intends from the start to perform the process on the neighbours' cat and then on himself, but is forced to rush his experiments due to persistent intrusion from his landlord, who is suspicious of his activities and considers him to be a vivisectionist. He processes himself to hide from his landlord and sets fire to the building to cover his tracks. He winds up alone, wandering invisible and naked through the streets of London, struggling to survive out in the open, unseen by those around him.

To make himself visible again, Griffin steals some clothes from a dingy backstreet theatre shop, including a trench-coat and hat. He wraps his head in bandages to conceal his invisibility, covering his eyes with large dark goggles. He takes up residence in the "Coach and Horses" Inn in the village of Iping so he can reverse his experiment in a quiet environment. Complications arise with locals unnerved by his appearance, particularly Teddy Henfrey, a clock-jobber who considers him to be a criminal evading persecution, and Mr. Cuss, who first encounters his invisibility. As a result, his progress slows and he has insufficient money to satisfy the innkeeper Mrs. Hall. To pay the bill, Griffin burgles the home of Reverend Bunting. The police pursue him and in a fit of frustrated anger, he reveals his invisibility by throwing off his clothes and escaping.

Now driven insane by his inability to reverse the experiment, Griffin seeks assistance from a tramp named Thomas Marvel. He has Marvel carry money for him, but Marvel runs away with the money. Griffin pursues him to the town of Port Burdock where he runs into his old schoolmate Dr. Kemp. Still bitter and angry towards the rest of humanity, Griffin attempts to convince Kemp to be his visible partner and help him begin a "reign of terror". Kemp, rather than assisting the crazed Invisible Man, alerts Colonel Adye of the Port Burdock police. Furious, Griffin vows to kill Kemp, but is forced to flee.

Kemp rallies the people of Port Burdock, who find and overcome Griffin when he attempts a one-man siege on Kemp's house. Griffin is surrounded and savagely beaten by navvies. His last words are "Mercy! Mercy!", prompting Kemp to call off the mob and administer first aid, though it is too late. Griffin dies, becoming visible again, revealing a brutally battered corpse.

Universal Classic Monsters

In the 1933 film The Invisible Man, Griffin's first name is Jack (the novel never reveals his first name). He was played by Claude Rains.

Jack Griffin works for Dr. Cranley, assisting him in food preservation experiments alongside his friend Dr. Arthur Kemp. Griffin is deeply in love with Cranley's daughter, Flora, and the two plan to marry, but Griffin is poor and thus afraid he has nothing to offer her. He begins experimenting with an obscure and dangerous drug called monocane, hoping his work will make him rich and famous—and a worthwhile husband for Flora. Griffin discovers a combination of monocane and other chemicals that makes a person invisible. Too excited by his discovery to think clearly, Griffin leaves Kemp and the Cranleys to complete the experiment in solitude. He injects himself with the formula over the course of a month and becomes invisible. Only after he is invisible does he realize that he does not know how to reverse the process. Panicking, Griffin goes to the village of Iping and rents a room in the Lion's Head Inn, where he begins searching for a formula to reverse the invisibility. He makes himself appear visible by wrapping his head in bandages and wearing dark goggles. Curious locals, the maddening side effects of monocane, and frustration from multiple failed tests drive Griffin insane. After he assaults Jenny Hall and severely injures her husband Herbert, Griffin is confronted by the police, but sheds his clothing to be invisible and eludes them. He seeks help from Kemp, but the monocane has so affected his mind that he succumbs to megalomania and plans world domination with "invisible armies". He wants to make Kemp his visible partner and assistant. Not even a visit from Flora and her father helps ease Griffin's increasing insanity. He vows to kill Kemp after his old friend alerts Inspector Lane to his whereabouts and despite intensive police protection surrounding Kemp, Griffin eventually makes good on his threats. After killing Kemp by tying him up in his car and sending it over a cliff, he seeks refuge from the cold in a farmer's barn. The farmer summons police, who set fire to the barn. As Griffin flees the burning barn, the Chief of Detectives, who can see his footprints in the snow, shoot at him, the shot passing through both of his lungs. Griffin dies from the gunshot wounds in the hospital. During this, the effects of the monocane begin to wear off and Griffin returns to sanity apologizing for his crimes by saying "I meddled in things that man must leave alone". The invisibility also wears off in death and Griffin's body becomes visible again.

The film portrays Griffin more sympathetically than the novel. The novel's Griffin is callous and cruel from the beginning and only pursues the experiment for wealth and his ego. The movie shows Griffin as an honorable man who is misguided. His insanity is purely a side-effect of the invisibility drug and his motivation for the experiment was a misguided desire to do good for science and mankind, born primarily out of his love for his fiancée.

Other Universal incarnations
 The Invisible Man Returns (1940): Vincent Price stars as Sir Geoffrey Radcliffe / Invisible Man. Radcliffe tries to clear himself of a murder charge and receives the serum from Jack Griffin's brother.
 The Invisible Woman (1940): Virginia Bruce stars as Kitty Carroll / Invisible Woman. A comedic installment in the franchise, Carroll becomes invisible after being subject to experimentation. There is no direct link to the previous films or Wells's novel.
 Invisible Agent (1942): Jon Hall stars as Frank Griffin Jr. / Frank Raymond / Invisible Man. Raymond is the grandson of original Invisible Man, but heroically uses the formula on himself to help the Allies during WWII.
 The Invisible Man's Revenge (1944): Jon Hall stars as Robert Griffin / Invisible Man. Griffin is a madman who seeks revenge on those who have wronged him, and becomes invisible upon experimentation.
 Abbott and Costello Meet Frankenstein (1948): Vincent Price reprises his role in a cameo appearance at the end of the film. 
 Abbott and Costello Meet the Invisible Man (1951): Arthur Franz stars as Tommy Nelson / Invisible Man. Nelson, a middleweight boxer, is framed for the murder of promoter. As he tries to clear himself of the crime, he gets the invisibility serum from a former colleague of Jack Griffin's. Claude Rains appears in a still-photograph, reprising his role as John "Jack" Griffin.

Reboot

Johnny Depp was to portray the Invisible Man as part of Universal's Dark Universe, a shared cinematic universe based on the classic Universal Monsters. It was uncertain if the character would be Dr. Griffin or a very different character. But on November 8, 2017, producers Alex Kurtzman and Chris Morgan moved on to other projects, leaving the future of the Dark Universe in doubt.

In January 2019, Universal announced that the plan moving forward was to focus on filmmaker-driven films, and less of an interconnection in the Dark Universe. Ultimately, Elisabeth Moss was given a starring role in the film as Cecilia Kass, while Oliver Jackson-Cohen and Michael Dorman were respectively cast as Adrian and Tom Griffin. The Invisible Man re-entered development, written and directed by Leigh Whannell and produced by Jason Blum. Johnny Depp still had option to star in the lead role, though all parties ultimately passed. The Invisible Man was released on February 28, 2020, receiving positive reviews. In this version, Adrian Griffin is a wealthy scientist and pioneer in the field of optics who fakes his death and becomes invisible to torment his ex-girlfriend Cecilia, whom he constantly abused. Unlike the novel and 1933 film, the invisibility is achieved through a suit fixed with hundreds of micro-cameras instead of an invisibility formula. When Adrian's brother Tom was found in the invisibility suit, Adrian used him as a scapegoat, claiming to Cecilia that Tom was holding him prisoner. In an attempt to get Adrian to confess, she meets him at his house to discuss her pregnancy while James listens in on a wire. Adrian insists that he had actually been kidnapped, claiming that his experience has changed his outlook on life and their relationship. Cecilia departs to use the restroom. Moments later, the room's security camera captures Adrian seemingly committing suicide by slicing his throat. Cecilia emerges from the bathroom and "frantically" calls the police. Off-camera, she taunts him to reveal that she had retrieved the earlier-hidden second invisibility suit to kill Adrian, and a horrified Adrian then dies, realizing that Cecilia has won and he has ultimately lost. When Detective James Lanier arrives and asks what happened, she confirms what the camera saw. He spots the invisibility suit in her bag, but accepts her story and allows her to leave.

Appearances in other works

Film

Mad Monster Party? and Mad Mad Mad Monsters
The Invisible Man appears in Mad Monster Party? voiced by Allen Swift, performing an impression of Claude Rains. This depiction of the Invisible Man is shown to wear a fez, dark glasses, and a purple dressing gown. He is among the monsters invited by Baron Boris von Frankenstein to attend his meeting at his castle on the Isle of Evil in the Caribbean Sea. A pie thrown into his face reveals that he has an enormous nose and is extremely ugly.

The Invisible Man appears in Mad Mad Mad Monsters (a "prequel of sorts" to Mad Monster Party?) voiced again by Allen Swift. This version goes by the name of Claude. He, his invisible wife Nagatha, their invisible son Ghoul, and his invisible dog Goblin are invited by Baron Henry von Frankenstein to attend the wedding of Frankenstein's Monster and the Monster's Bride at the Transylvania-Astoria Hotel on the midnight of Friday the 13th.

Hotel Transylvania series
In Genndy Tartakovsky's 2012 Sony Pictures Animation film Hotel Transylvania, Griffin the Invisible Man (voiced by David Spade) is one of the supporting character monsters who checks into Hotel Transylvania, and is among Count Dracula's (Adam Sandler) circle of friends. This version is completely invisible and his glasses are the only thing that can be seen in the movie. He is more outwardly, heroic and laid-back than his previous incarnations, which portray him as an aggressive, power-hungry psychopath. In one scene, Dracula makes a disparaging remark about people with red curly hair and Griffin takes offense to this saying that he has red curly hair, which is shown in Hotel Transylvania 4: Transformania. In the said fourth movie reveal he has been overweighted and balding for years after becoming an invisible mutate.

David Spade reprised his role as Griffin, the Invisible Man, in the 2015 sequel Hotel Transylvania 2. He unsuccessfully tries to make his friends think he has an invisible girlfriend (and finds one in the end).

Spade reprised the role again in the 2018 film Hotel Transylvania 3: Summer Vacation.

Spade reprised his role again in Hotel Transylvania: Transformania. While he is confirmed to have red hair that was previously mentioned in the first film, it is shown that he is balding when Griffin was hit by the Monsterfication Ray that makes him visible.

Radio
John Hurt voiced Griffin in the Big Finish Productions adaptation, released shortly after Hurt's death in 2017.

Influence

Literature

The League of Extraordinary Gentlemen

In Alan Moore and Kevin O'Neill's comic book series, The League of Extraordinary Gentlemen, Hawley Griffin is depicted as a member of the Victorian-era team of agents for which the series is named. Griffin is given the first name "Hawley" in the title (as a reference to Hawley Crippen), and it is explained that the Invisible Man killed at the end of the book was actually a half-wit albino that Griffin made invisible as a guinea pig, allowing him to escape to Rosa Coote's boarding school, where he rapes at least three women while posing as the Holy Spirit until he is captured by the rest of the League. He is portrayed as a power-hungry psychopath and murderer, as in the novel – at one point, killing a random policeman solely for his uniform and nearly abandoning the rest of the team on Professor Moriarty's cavorite-powered airship. In the second volume, he assaults Mina Murray and betrays his teammates to the Martians, stealing military plans for them so he could rule the Earth with them, and telling them to disable Nemo's submarine by doing something to the water in the Thames, which is why the Red Weed is used. Moore commented that it seemed fitting for Griffin to join the Martians as both hailed from novels by H. G. Wells. He is eventually raped and killed by Mister Hyde, who was able to see him all along as his vision operates in the infrared spectrum, a fact that he had hidden from Griffin.

The Nobody
In Jeff Lemire's The Nobody, a graphic novel retelling of the Wells story, the Invisible Man is named John Griffen. The character goes through a similar episode as the Invisible Mans Griffin does. Both men hide out in an inn in a small town, only to be driven out because of fear and curiosity.

Film and television

The Invisible Man (2000 TV series)
The Syfy television series The Invisible Man features thief/con man character Darien Fawkes (played by Vincent Ventresca) whose scientist brother worked on the development of a gland that made the subject invisibility by secreting a chemical known as 'quicksilver' throughout the body, the quicksilver bending light to render the subject invisible. Darien's nemesis was Arnaud DeFehrn (played by Joel Bissonnette), although he went by the Swiss-French name Arnaud De Thiel as a cover while working on the gland to sabotage it, DeFehrn's actions giving the gland a 'defect' where a low level of quicksilver seeping into the subject's brain will eventually drive the gland's owner insane without regular access to a specific drug to counter these effects. DeFehrn developed his own version of the gland, but became permanently invisible when it was imperfectly implanted. In attempting to retrieve the gland, he later uses the pseudonym Hawley Griffin (a reference to the League of Extraordinary Gentleman and the original Invisible Man), pretending to be a CIA agent from the South. The series concluded with DeFehrn's gland removed and Darien cured of the risk of quicksilver madness.

The League of Extraordinary Gentlemen
In the 2003 film adaptation of the League of Extraordinary Gentlemen comic book series, the Invisible Man who joins the League is not Griffin (due to copyright issues), but Rodney Skinner (played by Tony Curran), a cheerful thief who stole the invisibility formula from the original Invisible Man who was mentioned to be dead. The fact that his skin is invisible is also related to his name of "Skinner". Skin samples of him are taken by Dorian Gray for Professor Moriarty, allowing him to duplicate the invisibility process. Skinner infiltrates Moriarty's base to work out how best to destroy it. During the raid on Moriarty's lair, Moriarty's own unnamed invisible man is shot by Allan Quatermain while threatening Tom Sawyer. At the film's conclusion, the plans are lost through a hole in the ice when Moriarty is shot and Skinner decides to remain with the League, now composed of Captain Nemo, Mina Harker, Henry Jekyll, and Tom Sawyer.

Hollow Man series
In Claudio Fäh's 2006 Destination Films film Hollow Man 2, Michael Griffin (played by Christian Slater) is a soldier upon whom the formula developed by Sebastian Caine five years earlier is applied by the Reisner Institute, as a part of a covertly Department of Defense-funded operation to create the perfect assassin for black ops missions, codenamed "Silent Knight". The film is a stand-alone sequel to the 2000 Columbia Pictures sci-fi horror thriller film Hollow Man, directed by Paul Verhoeven.

See also

 The Invisible Man in popular culture
 Universal Monsters
 Hollow Man

References

Bibliography

External links
 
 

Characters in British novels of the 19th century
The Invisible Man
Fictional characters who can turn invisible
Fictional characters with albinism
Fictional English people
Fictional mad scientists
Fictional scientists
H. G. Wells
Male characters in literature
Male literary villains
Male horror film villains
Fictional mutants
Literary characters introduced in 1897
Characters in written science fiction
America's Best Comics characters
Fictional murderers
Fictional mass murderers
Fictional monsters